Talamana is a traditional system of Indian iconometry based on the Shilpa Shastras, which uses certain measurements and proportions in creating temple icons and images.

References 

 Dr G Gnanananda, "Sri Kashyapa Shilpa Shastram (3 volumes): Shilpa Shastra on Shiva, published by Shilpakala Academy, Bengaluru"

 Dr G Gnanananda, "Pratima Lakshana - complete information on the characteristics of gods like Ganesh, Skanda, Aiyappa and Brahma for carving idols:, Bangalore.
 Dr G Gnanananda, "Adranareeshvara Sampradayika shilpa (2019) : Iconography and traditional sculptural qualities, characteristic and methodologies are explained in detail" Sanskriti Sahithya Pratisthana, Publications, Bangalore"

Hindu temple architecture
Indian architectural history